Sandra Nurse (born April 3, 1984) is a Panamanian-born American carpenter and Democratic politician from New York City who has served as the New York City Council member for the 37th district since 2022. District 37 covers Bushwick and other neighborhoods in northern Brooklyn.

Early life
Nurse was born in Panama and raised by her mother, a U.S. Navy veteran.

Career
Prior to her runs for political office, Nurse worked in a number of jobs and fields, including as a waitress, a food delivery worker, a janitor, a community organizer, and most prominently a carpenter. She is also the founder of the Brooklyn-based composting organization BK ROT and a cofounder of the Mayday Space, a venue for progressive organizations.

2020 campaigns
In September 2019, Nurse announced that she would run for the 54th district of the New York State Assembly, challenging incumbent Democrat Erik Martin Dilan from the left. Nurse was one of two left-wing challengers in the race, alongside State Senator Julia Salazar's chief of staff, Boris Santos.

However, after City Councilmember Rafael Espinal resigned from the overlapping 37th district of the New York City Council in January 2020, Nurse chose to abandon her Assembly campaign and run in the special election to replace Espinal. Nurse was seen as one of two major candidates in the race alongside district leader Darma Diaz, who had the support of Espinal and was seen as the race's establishment candidate.

With the March arrival of the COVID-19 pandemic in New York City, the election took several unexpected turns. First, the planned April special election was suspended, then moved to June, and finally cancelled altogether in favor of a traditional primary and general election to be held in June and November. Governor Andrew Cuomo additionally decreed that, in light of the pandemic, the number of signatures required to make it onto the ballot would be significantly reduced – but the New York City Board of Elections ruled in April that the new requirements would not apply to the special election, leaving every candidate but Diaz short of the necessary number of signatures and thus barred from the ballot. Nurse fought the ruling and argued that the Brooklyn Democratic Party had meddled to ensure a Diaz victory, but was unsuccessful in reinstating herself on the special election ballot. Diaz thus was able to win both the primary and general elections completely unopposed.

2021 City Council campaign
In July 2020 – shortly after Diaz had won her special election primary – Nurse announced she would seek a rematch in the regularly scheduled 2021 City council election. As in the special election, Nurse ran a left-wing campaign, and received support from many of the city's most influential progressive officeholders and organizations, among them Congresswomen Alexandria Ocasio-Cortez and Nydia Velázquez, Public Advocate Jumaane Williams, and the Working Families Party.

On election night, Nurse comfortably led Diaz 51-24%, and acknowledged her likely victory on June 23; when absentee ballots and ranked-choice votes were counted two weeks later, she officially defeated Diaz by a ranked choice margin of 65-35%. Nurse subsequently won the general election with over 86% of the vote.

Personal life
Nurse lives in Cypress Hills. She identifies as Afro-Latina.

References

Living people
1984 births
Politicians from Brooklyn
American people of Panamanian descent
American politicians of Panamanian descent
New York (state) Democrats
American politicians of Puerto Rican descent
Puerto Rican people in New York (state) politics
Panamanian emigrants to the United States
Hispanic and Latino American women in politics
African-American people in New York (state) politics
21st-century American women politicians
21st-century American politicians
21st-century African-American women
21st-century African-American politicians
20th-century African-American people
20th-century African-American women
Women New York City Council members
New York City Council members
Hispanic and Latino American New York City Council members
African-American New York City Council members